Papaipema duplicatus, the dark stoneroot borer moth, is a species of cutworm or dart moth in the family Noctuidae. It is found in North America.

The MONA or Hodges number for Papaipema duplicatus is 9499.

References

Further reading

 
 
 
 

Papaipema
Articles created by Qbugbot
Moths described in 1908